Kenyon is a small village in the town of Richmond near its border with the town of Charlestown in the U.S. state of Rhode Island.

Overview
The population was 136 at the 2010 United States Census. The southern border of Kenyon is the Pawcatuck River. Its ZIP code is 02836. The equally small village of Shannock is located nearby.

References

Villages in Washington County, Rhode Island
Villages in Rhode Island